Erik Meijer may refer to:

Erik Meijer (politician) (born 1944), Dutch politician
Erik Meijer (computer scientist) (born 1963), Dutch computer scientist
Erik Meijer (footballer) (born 1969), Dutch soccer player